The United Nations Educational, Scientific and Cultural Organization (UNESCO) designates World Heritage Sites of outstanding universal value to cultural or natural heritage which  have been nominated by countries that are signatories to the UNESCO World Heritage Convention, established in 1972. Cultural heritage consists of monuments (such as architectural works, monumental sculptures, or inscriptions), groups of buildings, and sites (including archaeological sites). Natural heritage is defined as natural features (consisting of physical and biological formations), geological and physiographical formations (including habitats of threatened species of animals and plants), and natural sites which are important from the point of view of science, conservation or natural beauty. Portugal ratified the convention on 30 September, 1980.

, there are 17 World Heritage Sites listed in Portugal, with a further 19 on the tentative list. The first four sites listed in Portugal were the Monastery of the Hieronymites and Tower of Belém in Lisbon, the Monastery of Batalha, the Convent of Christ in Tomar, and the town of Angra do Heroísmo, in 1983. The most recent additions to the list were the Sanctuary of Bom Jesus do Monte in Braga and the Palace of Mafra with its hunting park in 2019. One site, the Laurisilva, is located in the island of Madeira and is Portugal's only natural site; the other sites are cultural. Two sites are located in the Azores archipelago. The Prehistoric Rock Art Sites in the Côa Valley and Siega Verde is shared with Spain, making it Portugal's only transnational site.



World Heritage Sites 
UNESCO lists sites under ten criteria; each entry must meet at least one of the criteria. Criteria i through vi are cultural and vii through x are natural.

Tentative list
In addition to sites inscribed on the World Heritage list, member states can maintain a list of tentative sites that they may consider for nomination. Nominations for the World Heritage list are only accepted if the site was previously listed on the tentative list. , Portugal recorded 19 sites on its tentative list.

See also
 Tourism in Portugal

References

External links
 
 Comissão Nacional da UNESCO – Portugal ["UNESCO National Commission – Portugal"] 

 
Tourism in Portugal
Portugal
World Heritage Sites